The 2012 Tro-Bro Léon was the 29th edition of the Tro-Bro Léon cycle race and was held on 15 April 2012. The race was won by Ryan Roth.

General classification

References

2012
2012 in road cycling
2012 in French sport